The West Point Band (also known as the U.S. Military Academy Band or USMA Band) is the U.S. Army's oldest active band and the oldest unit at the United States Military Academy, traces its roots to the American Revolutionary War. At that time, fifers and drummers were stationed with companies of minutemen on Constitution Island, across the river from West Point. In 1778, General Samuel Holden Parsons' 1st Connecticut Brigade crossed the Hudson River and established West Point as a permanent military post. After the American Revolution, Congress disbanded most of the Continental Army, but "the 55 men at West Point", members of the 2nd Continental Artillery, remained as they were. Among their ranks stood at least one drummer and one fifer, who alone maintained the tradition of military music at West Point.

With the establishment of the United States Military Academy in 1802 came an increased demand for military music. As the academy grew, it needed fifers, drummers and buglers to drill the new cadets and provide an audible order to their duty day. In 1817 the ensemble was named the "West Point Band," and by this time was performing on a full range of instruments, which included two bassoons, two Royal Kent bugles, a tenor bugle, ten clarinets, three French horns, a serpent (an early bass horn), cymbals, a bass drum, eight flutes, and two trumpets, aside from the fifes, drums and bugles used in field activities – the basis of the West Point Hellcats.

Today's band consists of the following components: the Concert Band, the Benny Havens Band, the Hellcats, the Marching Band and Support Staff. The organization fulfills all of the official musical requirements of the Academy, including military and patriotic ceremonies, public concerts, sporting events and radio and television broadcasts, as well as social activities for the Corps of Cadets and the West Point community.

As the senior premier musical representative of the United States Army, the band has appeared at many historical events. It performed at the dedication of the Erie Canal; at the Chicago and New York World's Fairs; and for the funerals of Ulysses S. Grant, Franklin D. Roosevelt, and Richard M. Nixon as well as the inaugurations of numerous presidents. Additionally, the West Point Band has collaborated with some of the finest musical ensembles in the country, including the New York Philharmonic, the Boston Pops, and the Mormon Tabernacle Choir. Members of the West Point Band have also been showcased in Carnegie Hall and featured on the Today Show, 60 Minutes, Dateline NBC, documentaries shown on The History Channel and Discovery Channel, and CD recordings for Columbia Records.

West Point Band was a two-time participant in the Macy's Thanksgiving Day Parade; having marched in the parade in 1970 and 2016.

See also

 The Jazz Knights
 List of United States military premier ensembles
 United States military bands

References

United States Military Academy
Bands of the United States Army
Wind bands
College marching bands in the United States
Ceremonial units of the United States military
Musical groups established in the 1810s
Military units and formations established in 1817
Military academy bands
1817 establishments in New York (state)